Particle displacement or displacement amplitude is a measurement of distance of the movement of a sound particle from its equilibrium position in a medium as it transmits a sound wave.  
The SI unit of particle displacement is the metre (m). In most cases this is a longitudinal wave of pressure (such as sound), but it can also be a transverse wave, such as the vibration of a taut string.  In the case of a sound wave travelling through air, the particle displacement is evident in the oscillations of air molecules with, and against, the direction in which the sound wave is travelling.

Mathematical definition 
Particle displacement, denoted δ, is given by

where v is the particle velocity.

Progressive sine waves
The particle displacement of a progressive sine wave is given by

where
 is the amplitude of the particle displacement;
 is the phase shift of the particle displacement;
 is the angular wavevector;
 is the angular frequency.

It follows that the particle velocity and the sound pressure along the direction of propagation of the sound wave x are given by

where
 is the amplitude of the particle velocity;
 is the phase shift of the particle velocity;
 is the amplitude of the acoustic pressure;
 is the phase shift of the acoustic pressure.

Taking the Laplace transforms of v and p with respect to time yields

Since , the amplitude of the specific acoustic impedance is given by

Consequently, the amplitude of the particle displacement is related to those of the particle velocity and the sound pressure by

See also
Sound
Sound particle
Particle velocity
Particle acceleration

References and notes

Related Reading:

External links
Acoustic Particle-Image Velocimetry. Development and Applications
Ohm's Law as Acoustic Equivalent. Calculations
Relationships of Acoustic Quantities Associated with a Plane Progressive Acoustic Sound Wave

Acoustics
Sound
Sound measurements
Physical quantities